Pak Yong-chol (박용철; 朴龍喆; 21 June 1904 – 12 May 1938) was a Korean poet and translator of Ibsen. Pak founded a "pure poetry group" and published a magazine named Shi munhak with Chong Chi-yong.

References

Korean male poets
20th-century Korean poets
Korean translators
20th-century deaths from tuberculosis
People from Gwangju
1904 births
1938 deaths
20th-century translators
Tuberculosis deaths in South Korea